Cypripedium shanxiense is a species of Cypripedium. It is found in China, northern Japan and the Russian Far East.

The internal structure of mature seeds is simple, there are internal and external double-layered skin, no endosperm; the embryo body is a spherical embryo.

References

shanxiense